The Moldovan Football Federation (FMF) is the governing body of football in Moldova. It organizes all the football leagues, including the top-tier league Moldovan Super Liga (Divizia Națională), and the Moldova national football team. It is based in Chișinău. The current president is Leonid Oleinicenco.

External links
Official website
Moldova at UEFA website
Moldova at FIFA website

Moldova
Football in Moldova
Futsal in Moldova
Football
Sports organizations established in 1990
1990 establishments in the Moldavian Soviet Socialist Republic
Sport in Chișinău